Gunnar Larsson (29 March 1940 – 4 May 2020) was a Swedish football and sports administrator, and politician. He was chairman of the Swedish football club IFK Göteborg from 1982 to 2000, during which the club won the Swedish championships ten times, Svenska Cupen three times, the UEFA Cup twice, first in 1981–82 and again in 1986–87, reached the semi-finals in the 1985–86 European Cup, and participated in four UEFA Champions League group stages.

Life and career
His father Torild Larsson played 117 matches for IFK Göteborg, and Gunnar represented the club on youth level, before playing for Lundby IF, where he also was chairman before being elected chairman for IFK Göteborg in 1982. He was also engaged in the Gothenburg Gymnastics Association, and after left the board of IFK Göteborg he was president of the Swedish Sports Confederation, the umbrella organisation of the Swedish sports movement, from 2001 to 2005. He remained at IFK Göteborg as chairman of the election committee, and was awarded the title of honorary chairman.

He was active as a politician for the Swedish Social Democratic Party, first entering the Gothenburg municipal council in 1973. In 1976 he started working full-time as a politician, first as municipal commissioner, and from 1982 to 1985 chairman of the municipal council and as such the mayor of Gothenburg. Larsson has also been chairman of the Swedish pension fund  and the Gothenburg opera house.

Larsson was sometimes called "Father Gunnar" for his sharpness, knowledge and strong lead of IFK Göteborg. Former IFK player Torbjörn Nilsson called him a father figure, and saying that "he was IFK Göteborg". Larsson has also been referred to as the most successful club leader in Swedish football history.

Larsson died from COVID-19 on 4 May 2020, during the COVID-19 pandemic in Sweden at the age of 80.

Honours and trophies won by IFK Göteborg during presidency 
 Swedish Champions
 Winners (10): 1982, 1983, 1984, 1987, 1990, 1991, 1993, 1994, 1995, 1996
 Allsvenskan:
 Winners (8): 1982, 1984, 1990, 1991, 1993, 1994, 1995, 1996
 Runners-up (3): 1986, 1988, 1997
 Mästerskapsserien:
 Winners (1): 1991
 Svenska Cupen:
 Winners (3): 1981–82, 1982–83, 1991
 Runners-up (2): 1985–86, 1998–99
 Allsvenskan play-offs:
 Winners (5): 1982, 1983, 1984, 1987, 1990
 Runners-up (1): 1985
 UEFA Cup:
 Winners (2): 1981–82, 1986–87
 European Cup/UEFA Champions League:
 Semi-finals (2): 1985–86, 1992–93
 Quarter-finals (3): 1984–85, 1988–89, 1994–95

Citations

References 

1940 births
2020 deaths
Swedish football chairmen and investors
Swedish sports executives and administrators
IFK Göteborg directors and chairmen
Swedish Social Democratic Party politicians
Mayors of Gothenburg
Deaths from the COVID-19 pandemic in Sweden